Brady Clark (born September 12, 1977) is an American curler from Lynnwood, Washington. Clark is a ten-time national mixed champion, three-time national mixed doubles champion, and two-time national men's champion (2013 & 2016). He has played in three World Mixed Doubles Curling Championships and one World Men's Championship.

Career
As a junior, Clark played in five national junior championships, placing 3rd in 1998 and 1999. He also won the National College Tournament in 1999. Following juniors, Clark went on to play in nine national men's championships, 12 national mixed championships, and five national mixed doubles championships. He won the 2013 and 2016 United States Men's Curling Championship. He has won 10 national mixed championships, winning in  2002, 2003, 2005, 2006, 2007, 2009, 2010, 2011 and 2012 & 2015. He has also won three national mixed doubles championships, in 2009, 2011 and 2012. These three national mixed doubles championships qualified him to play in the corresponding World Mixed Doubles championships. In 2009, Clark, and his teammate and his then-wife, Cristin would finish the tournament with a 3–5 record in their group, finishing 18th place over all. In 2011, the two Clarks went 5–2 in their group and lost in the quarterfinal to France. In 2012, Cristin and Brady finished 6–2 in their group, won their quarter final match against China, but lost in the semi final to Switzerland and the bronze medal game to Austria.

In the men's curling realm, Clark broke through at the 2013 United States Men's Curling Championship, finishing tied for third in the standings and qualifying for the playoffs through a tiebreaker. Clark defeated defending champion Heath McCormick, John Shuster, and Tyler George en route to securing his first national championship title, the first for the Granite Curling Club since 2004. Clark and his team then represented the United States at the 2013 Ford World Men's Curling Championship, finishing in ninth place with a 5–6 win–loss record, and fell short of qualifying the United States directly into the main tournament of the 2014 Winter Olympics by one win. Clark's team also won the 2016 US Men's National Championship in Jacksonville, FL in February 2016.

Upon their semifinal win at the 2013 United States Men's Curling Championship, Clark and his team were qualified to participate at the 2014 United States Olympic Curling Trials.

Personal life 
Clark's former wife Cristin is also a curler and they won the United States Mixed National Championship ten times together. Clark proposed to Cristin at the local curling rink.

Grand Slam record
Clark qualified for his first career Grand Slam event, the 2016 Humpty's Champions Cup by winning the 2016 U.S. Championship.

References

External links
 
 Brady Clark on the United States Curling Association database

1977 births
Living people
Sportspeople from Grand Forks, North Dakota
American male curlers
People from Lynnwood, Washington
American curling champions